John Thomas (11 March 1936 – 7 February 1995) was an Australian ice hockey player. He competed in the men's tournament at the 1960 Winter Olympics.

References

1936 births
1995 deaths
Australian ice hockey players
Olympic ice hockey players of Australia
Ice hockey players at the 1960 Winter Olympics
Sportspeople from Melbourne